This is a list of publications by Fred Melville. The list is primarily of philatelic books, however, Melville also wrote a great many articles about philately and in addition was editor of the popular journals Heartsease Library, Cosy Corner, Good Words and Sunday Magazine, for all of which he most probably produced articles.

Melville Stamp Books 
British Central Africa and Nyasaland Protectorate, 1909, 84pp
British New Guinea and Papua, 1909, 63pp
Cape of Good Hope, 1913, 96pp
Cayman Islands, 1912, 72pp
Confederate States of America; Government Postage Stamps, 1913, 72pp
Gambia, 1909, 84pp.
Great Britain: Embossed Adhesive Stamps, 1910, 39pp
Great Britain: King Edward VII Stamps, 1911, 83pp
Holland, 1909, 77pp
Jamaica, 1910, 89pp
Nevis, 2nd edition 1910, 60pp (1st edition 1909)
Portugal: Postage Stamps, 1880-1911, 1911, 85pp
Portugal; The cameo stamps, 1911, 90pp
St Helena, 1912, 92pp
Tonga, 1909, 65pp
United States Postage Stamps 1870-1893, 1910, 55pp
United States Postage Stamps 1894-1910, 1910, 76pp

Philatelic Institute publications 
Aero Stamp Collecting: A Practical Guide and Descriptive Catalogue, 2nd edition, 1924, 62p. (1st edition, 1923, 56p.)
Aero Stamps: A descriptive catalogue with prices, November 1920, 16p.
Andorra, 1936, 48p.
Antigua, 1929, 57p.
Azerbaijan, n.d. (1924), 24p. Philatelic Institute papers; no. 17.
Baden, 1928, 59p.
The Boys Own Guide to Stamp Collecting, 1924, 55p.
The British Prisoners' Stamps of Ruhleben, 1919, 4p. Philatelic Institute papers; no. 2.
Brunei, 1932, 37p.
Cape of Good Hope: The Fourpence Black Triangular Stamp, 1927, 7p. Philatelic Institute papers; no. 19.
The Complete Philatelist, 1924, 246p.
The Grammar Of Philately, 1924, 18p. Philatelic Institute papers; no. 8.
Great Britain: The Line Engraved Stamps, 3rd Edition, 1925, 82p. (Previous editions: 1909 and 1910).
History from the Stamp Album, 1924, 16p. Philatelic Institute papers; no. 11.
How to Collect War Stamps: practical and suggestive hints for the collector accompanying a representative collection of 100 different stamps issued during the Great War, 1919, 16p.
Local Postage Stamps, 1924, 14p. Philatelic Institute papers; no. 13.
Oil Rivers and Niger Coast Protectorates, 1924, 58p.
Origins of the Penny Post, 1930, 130p.
Phantom Philately: A descriptive list of stamps that are not what they seem, 1923, 204p.
Philatelic Accessories, 1924, 15p. Philatelic Institute papers; no. 9.
The Philatelic Library, 1924, 20p. Philatelic Institute papers; no. 16.
The Postage Stamps of the Mozambique Company, 1918, 9p. Philatelic Institute papers; no. 3.
Postal Stationery, c1924, 12p. Philatelic Institute papers; no. 14.
Postmarks, c1924, 11p. Philatelic Institute papers; no. 15.
A Simplified Collection, 1924, 8p. Philatelic Institute papers; no. 12.
Switzerland: The Children's Stamps, Pro Juventute, 1925, 14p. Philatelic Institute papers; no. 10.
United States Postage Stamps 1922-1925, 1925, 93p.
The Victory Album Of War Stamps, 1920, 44p.
Virgin Islands, 1928, 68p.
The War Stamps of Turkey, S.A., 14p. by Lieut.-Col. H Wood, edited by Fred J. Melville. Philatelic Institute papers; no. 5.

Other publications 

A Penny All the Way. The Story of Penny Postage, W H Peckitt, 2nd edition, 1908, 48pp
A Penny All the Way. The Story of Penny Postage, Warren H Colson, American edition, 1908, 34pp
Abyssinia, C Baldwin, 1909, 31pp
All about Postage Stamps, T. Werner Laurie, London, 1914, 255pp
An Historical Catalogue of the Stamps of the New Europe, 2nd edition 1919, 48pp
An Innocent Afloat, F J Melville, 1926, 15pp
Catalogue of War Stamps, 1914–15, J F Spriggs, 1st edition 1915, 16pp
Catalogue of War Stamps, 1914–15, J F Spriggs, 2nd edition 1915, 48pp
Chats on Postage Stamps, Fisher & Unwin, 1911, 362pp
Chats on Postage Stamps, Frederick A Stokes Company, American edition, 1911, 362pp
El nuevo ABC del coleccionista de sellos, Santiago de Cuba, Arroyo Hnos, Castilian edition of The New ABC of Stamp Collecting translated by J D Sague, 1926, 166pp
Egypt, Stanley Gibbons, London, 1915, 84pp
Frimärken Värda Förmögenheter, Sveriges Filatelist-Förenings Förlag, Swedish edition of Postage Stamps Worth Fortunes translated by L Harald Kjellstedt, 1910, 43pp
Great Britain: Reel printing for postage stamps, 1924, 7pp
Guide to Stamp Collecting, G F Rapkin, 1924, 60pp
How to Start a Philatelic Society, Peckitt, 1910
Latvia Map Stamps. A tentative check list, 1922
Les premières emissions de timbres de la Grande-Bretagne, Mendel, French edition of Great Britain: The Line Engraved Stamps translated by Georges Brunel, 1912
Les timbres de Gambie, Édition des publications modernes, French edition of Gambia translated by Georges Brunel, 1914
Les timbres de la Jamaïque, Édition des publications modernes, French edition of Jamaica translated by Georges Brunel, 1914
Modern Stamp Collecting, English Universities Press Ltd, 1940, 316pp
New Hebrides, C Baldwin, c1910, 20pp
Phantom Philately; a descriptive list of stamps that are not what they seem, Emile Bertrand, 1950, 204pp (with a foreword by Lowell Ragatz)
Pioneer Stamp Men of Liverpool, W G Warner, 1926, 19pp
Postage Stamp Printing, Pardy, 1925, 19pp
Postage Stamps in the Making, Stanley Gibbons, 1916, 198pp
Postage Stamps of the Hawaiian Islands in the Collection of Henry J. Crocker of San Francisco, Stamp Lover, 1908, 9pp
Postage Stamps of the United States of America, Junior Philatelic Society, 1905, 116pp
Postage Stamps worth Fortunes, (self published), 1908, 46pp
Postage Stamps worth Fortunes, Severn-Wylie-Jewett Co, American edition, 1918
Rare stamps: How to Recognize Them, Melville Book Co, 1922, 46pp
Siam: Its Posts and Postage Stamps, Stamp Collectors' Fortnightly, 1906, 53pp.
Stamp Collecting, 1897.
Stamp Collections for War Museums, Stanley Gibbons, 1918, 40pp
Stamps of the Steamship Companies: A Rough List, 1915, 34pp
The ABC of Stamp Collecting, Henry J Drane, 1903, 159pp
The Boys Friend Book of Stamps of the British Empire, 1925, 19pp
The Cradle of the Postage Stamp,  Harmer Rooke, 1923 30pp
The Lady Forger: an original play, Junior Philatelic Society, 1906
The Mayfair find of Rare Stamps, H R Harmer, 1925, 44pp
The Mystery Of the Shilling Green, Chas Nissen & Co Ltd, 1926, 16pp
The New ABC of Stamp Collecting, Melville Stamp Company, 1922, 145pp
The Postage Stamp in War, 1915, 160pp
The Postage Stamps of British Central Africa, Severn-Wylie-Jewett, 1918, 28pp
The postage stamps of China; with a history of the Chinese Imperial Post, 1908, 44pp
The Postage Stamps of Great Britain, Junior Philatelic Society, 1904, 56pp
The Postage Stamps of Hayti, C Nissen & Co, 1905, 69pp
The Postage Stamps of Sarawak 1869-1906, C Nissen & Co, 1907, 84pp
The Postage Stamps of the Cayman Islands, Severn-Wylie-Jewett, 1920, 22pp
The Romance of Postage Stamps, W.H. Peckitt, London, 1910, 36pp
The Romance of Postage Stamps: A Short Introduction to the Joys of the Stamp album, Peckitt, 1908, 30pp
The Soldier and His Stamps Together with the Junior Philatelic Society's Roll of Honour, Stanley Gibbons, 1918, 60pp.
The Tapling Collection of Stamps and Postal Stationery at the British Museum, 1905.
The Wm. H. Crocker Collection of rare stamps of the whole World, Harmer Rooke & Co., 1938, 42pp
The World's Stamp Errors Part I The British Empire, W H Peckitt, 1910, 59pp (under pseudonym Miss Fitte)
The World's Stamp Errors Part II Foreign Countries, W H Peckitt, 1910, 50pp (under pseudonym Miss Fitte)
Then and Now, Whitfield King, 1938, 43pp
United States Postage Stamps 1847-1869, Stanley Gibbons, 3rd edition 1915, 71pp
United States Special Service Stamps, Stanley Gibbons, 1915, 69pp
War Stamps of Salonika & Long Island, Stanley Gibbons, 1916, 54pp

References

Further reading

Williams, L.N. & M., A "Melville" Bibliography, H.F. Johnson, London, 1941. (Reprinted with additions and amendments from The Stamp Lover, January to May, 1941.)

British philatelists
Philatelic authors